Flight 301 may refer to:

Canadian Pacific Air Lines Flight 301, crashed on 22 July 1962
Turkish Airlines Flight 301, crashed on January 26, 1974
Air India Flight 301, attempted bombed on June 23, 1985
CAAC Flight 301, crashed on August 31, 1988
Palair Macedonian Airlines Flight 301, crashed on 5 March 1993
Birgenair Flight 301, crashed on 6 February 1996
Lao Airlines Flight 301, crashed on 16 October 2013

0301